Grace Ann McCallum (born October 30, 2002) is an American artistic gymnast. She represented the United States at the 2020 Summer Olympics and won a silver medal in the team event. She is the 2018 Pan American and 2018 Pacific Rim individual all-around champion, the 2018 Pan American uneven bars champion, and was a member of the U.S. gymnastics team that won gold at the 2018 and 2019 World Championships and the 2018 Pan American Championships.

Personal life 
McCallum was born in Cambridge, Minnesota to Sandra and Edward McCallum. She is one of seven children. She finished high school online through Connections Academy and has a German Shepherd named Bella. McCallum is a devout Roman Catholic.

Gymnastics career

Junior
In 2017, McCallum competed at the 2017 U.S. Classic where she placed third in the all-around and first on vault. At Nationals she placed 11th in the all-around and fourth on vault.

Senior

2018 
McCallum turned senior 2018 and was officially added to the senior national team when she was named to the team to compete at the 2018 Pacific Rim Gymnastics Championships. There she won gold in the team and all-around finals and won silver on vault and floor exercise. McCallum also competed at the 2018 City of Jesolo Trophy where she placed fifth in the all-around, fifth on vault, and third on floor exercise.

In early July, McCallum competed at the American Classic, where she only competed on uneven bars and balance beam. She finished second and ninth respectively.

Later that month, McCallum competed at the GK US Classic, where she placed eleventh in the all-around. She also placed eighteenth on bars, twelfth on beam, and tied for seventh on floor with Shania Adams.

In August McCallum competed at the National Championships where she placed fourth in the all-around, behind Simone Biles, Morgan Hurd, and Riley McCusker. She also finished fourth on floor exercise, sixth on uneven bars, and fifth on balance beam. On August 20 McCallum was named to the team to compete at the Pan American Championships alongside Jade Carey, Trinity Thomas, Kara Eaker, and Shilese Jones. There she won gold in the team finals, all-around, and uneven bars and won bronze on vault and balance beam. She had the fourth highest score on floor exercise. Her all-around score of 57.000 during the team final was the second-highest international score in the world in 2018, behind only all-around champion Biles.

In October McCallum participated in the Worlds Team Selection Camp. During the competition she placed second on floor exercise behind Biles, third in the all-around behind Biles and McCusker, fifth on balance beam and vault, and seventh on uneven bars. The following day she was named to the team to compete at the 2018 World Championships alongside Biles, Hurd, McCusker, Eaker, and alternate Ragan Smith.

During qualifications the US qualified in first place to the team final. Individually McCallum qualified as the second reserve to the vault final and placed seventh on floor exercise, but did not qualify due to teammates Biles and Hurd scoring higher.  During the team final McCallum competed on only vault and floor exercise. She contributed 14.533 and 13.633 respectively towards the USA's team total. USA won gold with a score of 171.629, 8.766 points ahead of second-place Russia, beating previous margin of victory records set in the open-ended code of points era at the 2014 World Championships (6.693) and the 2016 Olympic Games (8.209).

2019 
In January, it was announced that McCallum would represent the USA at the American Cup alongside first year senior Leanne Wong in March. There she won the silver all-around medal behind Wong and ahead of the two previous World silver all-around medalists, Ellie Black of Canada (2017) and Mai Murakami of Japan (2018), who tied for third place.  At February’s team training camp, McCallum placed first in the all-around ahead of the other national team members.

At the 2019 GK US Classic in July, McCallum placed third in the all-around behind Simone Biles and Riley McCusker. She also tied for third on bars with McCusker and behind Morgan Hurd and Sunisa Lee, placed fifth on beam, and tied for second on floor with Jade Carey and behind Biles. Additionally she had the fourth highest single vault score behind Biles, Carey, and MyKayla Skinner but had the highest scoring double-twisting yurchenko.

At the 2019 U.S. National Championships, McCallum competed all four events on the first day of competition but counted two falls and ended the night in ninth place, tied with MyKayla Skinner. On the second day of competition she competed all her routines cleanly and was able to make a comeback and finished the competition in third place behind Simone Biles and Sunisa Lee.  She also finished in sixth on bars, eighth on beam, and fourth on floor. As a result she was added to the national team for the third time.

In September McCallum competed at the US World Championships trials where she placed sixth in the all-around behind Simone Biles, Sunisa Lee, Kara Eaker, MyKayla Skinner, and Jade Carey after falling off the uneven bars. On the second day of trials, she competed on bars and beam, finishing third on bars behind Lee and Biles. The following day she was named to the team to compete at the 2019 World Championships in Stuttgart alongside Biles, Lee, Eaker, Skinner, and Carey.

During the qualification round at the World Championships, McCallum helped the USA qualify to the team final in first place over five points ahead of second place China. She recorded the fifth highest all-around score despite falling on balance beam, but did not advance to the final due to teammates Biles and Lee scoring higher than her. Additionally, she placed ninth on floor exercise and tenth on uneven bars, but was not named a reserve athlete for either final due to both Biles and Lee qualifying above her on those two events.  In the team final, McCallum competed on vault and uneven bars, helping the USA win the gold medal ahead of Russia and Italy, making this McCallum’s second consecutive gold medal in the team final.

2020 
In early February it was announced that McCallum was selected to represent the United States at the Birmingham World Cup taking place in late March.  However the Birmingham World Cup was later canceled due to the COVID-19 pandemic in the United Kingdom.

In November McCallum signed her National Letter of Intent with the University of Utah, intending to start in the 2021–22 school year.

2021 
McCallum competed at the American Classic in April.  She only competed on the balance beam where she recorded the fourth highest score.  In May McCallum competed the all-around at the U.S. Classic where she placed fourth behind Simone Biles, Jordan Chiles, and Kayla DiCello.  At the National Championships McCallum finished seventh in the all-around.  Additionally she won bronze on balance beam behind Biles and Sunisa Lee.  As a result she was named to the national team and selected to compete at the upcoming Olympic Trials.  McCallum finished fourth at the Olympic Trials and was named to the four-person team to represent the United States at the 2020 Summer Olympics alongside Biles, Lee, and Chiles.

At the Olympic Games McCallum performed the all-around during qualifications and helped the USA qualify to the team final in second place behind the athletes from Russia.  She finished qualifications in thirteenth place; however she did not advance to the final due to two-per-country limitations as Biles and Lee had placed higher.  During the team final McCallum competed on all four apparatuses.  After the first rotation Biles withdrew from the competition and the United States finished second behind the Russian Olympic Committee athletes.

In August McCallum announced that she would be joining Simone Biles' Gold Over America Tour.

NCAA

2021–22 season 
McCallum made her NCAA debut on January 7 at the Best of Utah meet where she competed the all-around to help Utah win.  She put up the highest vault score of the night, a 9.90, alongside teammate Jaedyn Rucker.  The following week McCallum once again competed the all-around to help Utah win against Oklahoma.  She recorded the highest all-around and floor exercise scores of the night with a 39.675 and 9.975 respectively.  As a result she was named Pac-12 freshman of the week.  On February 4, in a meet against UCLA, McCallum earned her first collegiate perfect ten on the uneven bars.

At the Pac-12 Championships McCallum helped Utah win their second consecutive team title.  Individually she placed second in the all-around behind Olympic teammate Jade Carey.  She earned her second perfect ten on the uneven bars to outright win the title and co-won the title on floor exercise alongside Carey.

Career perfect 10.0

Selected competitive skills

Competitive history

References 

2002 births
Living people
American female artistic gymnasts
Medalists at the World Artistic Gymnastics Championships
Sportspeople from Minnesota
People from Isanti County, Minnesota
U.S. women's national team gymnasts
American Roman Catholics
Gymnasts at the 2020 Summer Olympics
Olympic gymnasts of the United States
Olympic silver medalists for the United States in gymnastics
Medalists at the 2020 Summer Olympics
Utah Red Rocks gymnasts
NCAA gymnasts who have scored a perfect 10